This is a list of transactions that have taken place during the off-season and the 2018 WNBA season.

Retirement

Front office movements

Head coach changes
Off-season

In-season

Player movement

Trades

Free agency

Waived

Training camp cuts
All players listed did not make the final roster.

Draft

First round

Second round

Third round

Previous years' draftees

References

Transactions